Misbah El-Ahdab (مصباح الأحدب), born on April 1, 1962 in Tripoli, Lebanon, is a Lebanese politician and a former MP representing Tripoli in the Lebanese Parliament. He was elected to parliament in 1996 and re-elected in the legislative elections of 2000 and 2005.

El-Ahdab holds a bachelor's degree in Business Administration from European Business School Paris and another degree in Economics from London School of Economics. He is Vice-president of the cross-confessional Democratic Renewal Movement that he co-founded in 2001 with MP Nassib Lahoud and other politicians. He is also President of the Lebanese-Italian Friendship Association.

Lebanese Protests 
On October 18, 2019, El-Ahdab attempted to participate in a people's protest held in Tripoli. Widespread protests were erupting in Lebanon due to economic and political instability (see 2019–20 Lebanese protests). The protesters vehemently denied El-Ahdab participation in a people's movement against all politicians, and began throwing plastic and glass bottles at him and his convoy. Although two of El-Ahdab's bodyguards returned fire with assault rifles, it is unclear who opened fire on the protesters, killing two people and injuring at least four.

References 

European Business School Paris alumni
Alumni of the London School of Economics
Members of the Parliament of Lebanon
1962 births
Living people
Lebanese Sunni Muslims
People from Tripoli, Lebanon